The 2022 North Dakota House of Representatives elections were held on November 8, 2022, as part of the biennial 2022 United States elections. Sixty-six of the seats in the North Dakota House of Representatives were up for election. Primary elections were held on June 14, 2022. The elections coincided with elections for other offices in North Dakota, including the US Senate, US House, North Dakota Secretary of State, North Dakota Attorney General, and the North Dakota Senate.
 
Following the 2022 elections, Republicans expanded their supermajority by two seats, giving them an 82-to-12 member advantage over Democrats.

Retirements

Democrats
District 11: Ron Guggisberg retired.
District 41: Pamela Anderson retired.

Republicans
District 3: Bob Paulson retired to run for state senator from District 3.
District 7: Rich Becker retired to run for U. S. senator.
District 8: Dave Nehring retired to run for state senator from District 8.
District 13: Kim Koppelman retired.
District 17: Mark Owens retired.
District 19: Gary Paur retired.
District 19: Wayne Trottier retired.
District 23: Bill Devlin retired.
District 26: Sebastian Ertelt retired to run for state senator from District 28.
District 28: Jeffery Magrum retired to run for state senator from District 8.
District 29: Chet Pollert retired.
District 39: Denton Zubke retired.
District 45: Mary Johnson retired.
District 45: Tom Kading retired.
District 47: Robb Eckert retired.

Predictions

Defeated Incumbents

Primary Election
District 9A: Democratic incumbent Tracy Boe was defeated in the Democratic primary election by Jayme Davis.
District 9B: Republican incumbent Chuck Damschen was defeated in the Republican primary election by Republican Donna Henderson. Damschen also ran in the general election as a Republican write-in candidate and lost to Henderson again.
District 15: Republican incumbent Greg Westlind was defeated in the Republican primary election. He placed third behind Kathy Frelich and fellow Republican incumbent Dennis Johnson.
District 31: Republican incumbent Jim Schmidt was defeated in the Republican primary election. He placed third behind Dawson Holle and fellow Republican incumbent Karen Rohr.
District 33: Republican incumbent Jeff Delzer was defeated in the Republican primary election. He placed third behind Anna Novak and fellow Republican incumbent Bill Tveit.

General Election
District 4A: Republican incumbent Terry B. Jones was defeated in the general election by Democrat Lisa Finley-DeVille.
District 9B: Democratic incumbent Marvin Nelson was defeated in the general election by Republican Donna Henderson.
District 25: Republican incumbent Kathy Skroch was defeated in the general election by Democratic incumbent Alisa Mitskog and fellow Republican incumbent Cindy Schreiber-Beck.
District 27: Democratic incumbent Ruth Buffalo was defeated in the general election by Republicans Josh Christy & incumbent Greg Stemen.
District 43: Democratic incumbent Mary Adams was defeated in the general election by Republican Eric Murphy & fellow incumbent Democrat Zac Ista.

Summary of Results by State House District
Districts not listed were not up for election in 2022.

Primary Election Results Source:

General Election Results Source:

Detailed results

Primary Election Results Source:

General Election Results Source:
Note: If a primary election is not listed, then there was not a competitive primary in that district (i.e., every candidate who ran in the primary advanced to the general election).

District 1
General election

District 3
Republican primary

General election

District 4A
Republican primary

General election

District 4B
General election

District 5
General election

District 7
Republican primary

General election

District 8
Republican primary

General election

District 9A
Democratic primary

General election

District 9B
Republican primary

General election

District 10
General election

District 11
General election

District 13
General election

District 15
Republican primary

General election

District 17
General election

District 19
Republican primary

General election

District 20
Republican primary

General election

District 21
General election

District 23
General election

District 24
Republican primary

General election

District 25
Republican primary

General election

District 26
General election

District 27
General election

District 28
Republican primary

General election

District 29
General election

District 31
Republican primary

General election

District 33
Republican primary

General election

District 35
General election

District 36
General election

District 37
General election

District 39
Republican primary

General election

District 41
General election

District 43
General election

District 44
General election

District 45
General election

District 47
Republican primary

General election

References 

North Dakota House of Representatives elections
North Dakota House of Representatives
House of Representatives